Sigvatr Þórðarson or Sighvatr Þórðarson or Sigvat the Skald (995–1045) was an Icelandic skald. He was a court poet to King Olaf II of Norway, as well as Canute the Great, Magnus the Good and Anund Jacob, by whose reigns his floruit can be dated to the earlier eleventh century. Sigvatr was the best known of the court skalds of King Olaf and also served as his marshal (stallare), even baptizing his son Magnus.

Approximately 160 verses of Sigvatr's poetry have been preserved, more than any for other poet from this period. The style of Sigvat's poems is simpler and clearer than that which generally characterises older compositions. Although his verse is still dense, he uses fewer complex poetic circumlocutions than many of his predecessors, and as a Christian poet, he by and large avoids allusions to pagan mythology.

Most of his surviving poems were texts that praised King Olaf. Many of the poems from St. Olaf's saga in Heimskringla are by Sigvatr.  Víkingarvísur,  composed c. 1014–15, is the oldest of the surviving long poems attributed to him. The poem tallies King Olaf's battles on his Viking expeditions until 1015, when he returned to Norway to carve out a kingdom for himself.

In Nesjavísur, the next oldest poem by Sigvatr, the skald describes the naval battle between Olaf and Sveinn Hákonarson at the Battle of Nesjar outside Brunlanes in 1016, the key moment in Olaf's ascent to power in Norway.

Preserved poetry
 Víkingarvísur (‘verses of a Viking-raid’) — on the early deeds of King Olaf
 Nesjavísur (‘verses of Nesjar’) — on the Battle of Nesjar
 Austrfararvísur (‘verses of an eastern journey’) — on a diplomatic journey to Sweden
 A drápa about King Olaf
 Vestrfararvísur (‘verses of a western journey’) — on a journey to Great Britain
 Two poems about Erlingr Skjalgsson
 Tryggvaflokkr (‘a flock about Tryggvi’) — on Tryggve the Pretender 
 A poem about Queen Astrid  
 Knútsdrápa (‘Drápa of Knút’) — in memory of King Canute the Great
 Bersöglisvísur (‘verses of plain-speaking’) — reprimand to King Magnus
 Erfidrápa Óláfs helga (‘Saint Olaf's inheritance-drápa’) — in memory of King Olaf
 Numerous Lausavísur
 Brot - fragments

Notes

References

Other sources
Whaley, Diana  (editor) Poetry from the Kings' Sagas 1, From Mythical Times to c. 1035 (Brepols Publishers. 2013) 
O'Donoghue, Heather (2005) Skaldic Verse and the Poetics of Saga Narrative (Oxford University Press)

External links
 Index of Sigvatr Þórðarson's poetry, Skaldic Poetry of the Scandinavian Middle Ages.
 Index of Sigvatr Þórðarson's poetry, Jörmungrund.

Icelandic male poets
11th-century Icelandic poets
995 births
1045 deaths
Skalds